A-One Punjabi TV is the first HD Punjabi TV channel in India. Owned by Aone Network and headquartered in Noida, India, Chakde TV is classified as Category and exempt third-language services. A-One Punjabi TV produces 80% of its content locally.

References from 

Punjabi-language television channels in India
Jalandhar